Pascal Baills (born 30 December 1964) is a French former professional footballer who played as a defender. He won one cap for the France national team.

He became assistant coach to Jean-Francois Domergue and subsequently Rolland Courbis at Montpellier HSC. In 2009, he became assistant to Montpellier's coach René Girard and the club  won the championship of France in 2012.

Honours

As a player
Marseille
French championship: 1992

Montpellier
Coupe de France: 1990

As assistant coach
Montpellier
French championship: 2012

External links
 
 
 Stats 

1964 births
Living people
French footballers
France international footballers
Association football defenders
Montpellier HSC players
Olympique de Marseille players
RC Strasbourg Alsace players
Ligue 1 players
Ligue 2 players
Sportspeople from Perpignan
Footballers from Occitania (administrative region)